The First Moderns: Profiles in the Origins of Twentieth-Century Thought is a book on Modernism by historian William Everdell, published in 1997 by the University of Chicago Press. A New York Times Notable Book of 1997, and included by the New York Public Library on its list of "25 Books to Remember from 1997," The First Moderns suggests that "the heart of Modernism is the postulate of ontological discontinuity."

Background and overview

Everdell, Dean of Humanities at Saint Ann's School in Brooklyn Heights, posits that Modernism first emerged in the field of mathematics rather than the arts, specifically in the work of German mathematician Richard Dedekind, who, in 1872, demonstrated that mathematicians operate without a continuum; this represents the formalization of Everdell's axiom of "ontological discontinuity," which he goes on to examine in a multiplicity of contexts. He examines this emerging framework of discreteness in science (Ludwig Boltzmann's mechanics, Cajal's neuroscience, Hugo de Vries's conception of the gene and Max Planck's quantum work, Albert Einstein's physics); mathematics, logic, and philosophy (Georg Cantor, Gottlob Frege, Bertrand Russell and the linguistic turn, Husserl and the beginnings of phenomenology); in addition to the arts (James Joyce's novels, Picasso's Demoiselles D'Avignon, Schoenberg's twelve-tone music).

Reviews

Critics largely reviewed The First Moderns favorably, appreciating Everdell's interdisciplinary approach, in publications including the New York Review of Books, the New York Times, the Los Angeles Times, and the Washington Post. Pulitzer Prize-winning book critic Michael Dirda considers it among his "favorites."

References

Modernism
1997 non-fiction books
Art history books
History of mathematics
History of philosophy
History of literature
Modernity